The rivière des Chenaux (English: Channel river) is a tributary of the Lombrette River flowing on the north shore of the Saint Lawrence river, in the administrative region of Capitale-Nationale, in the province of Quebec, in Canada. This river flows consecutively through the regional county municipalities (MRC) of:
 Charlevoix Regional County Municipality: in the municipality of Petite-Rivière-Saint-François;
 La Côte-de-Beaupré Regional County Municipality: in the municipality of Saint-Tite-des-Caps.

This small valley is mainly served by the Route 138 which normally runs along the north shore of the St. Lawrence River; however, it distances itself from the river in this area of Charlevoix. The route 360 serves the lower part. Forestry is the main economic activity in this valley; second-hand tourist activities.

The surface of the Chenaux River is generally frozen from the beginning of December until the end of March; however, safe traffic on the ice is generally from mid-December to mid-March. The water level of the river varies with the seasons and the precipitation; the spring flood occurs in March or April.

Geography 
The Chenaux River rises in Petite-Rivière-Saint-François at the mouth of Lac Fortin (altitude of ). This small lake between the mountains is located south of Lac Gagné and southwest of Lac la Flippe at:
  east of the west bank of the St. Lawrence River;
  south-west of the center of the village of Petite-Rivière-Saint-François;
  north of the village center of Saint-Tite-des-Caps;
  northeast of downtown Quebec.

  south, to the outlet (from the west) of a small lake;
  towards the south-east by forming numerous small snakes in places, up to the outlet (coming from the south-east) of a lake;
  first towards the west, then towards the south, until the outlet (coming from the west) of a small lake;
  to the south, forming a hook towards the west at the end of the segment and crossing Lac des Chenaux, up to its mouth;
  to the south, branching off mid-segment east, to a stream (coming from the north);
  to the south in the forest zone, while winding in places, until the outlet of the unidentified stream (coming from the west);
  first towards the east, then towards the south-east in the agricultural and forestry zone by crossing the route 360, until its mouth.

The Chenaux river flows on the west bank of the Lombrette river, in Saint-Tite-des-Caps, in an area near Domaine-Lombrette, between route 360 and route 138. This confluence is located at:
  east of the west bank of the St. Lawrence River;
  north of the village center of Saint-Tite-des-Caps;
  south-west of the center of the village of Petite-Rivière-Saint-François;
  northeast of downtown Quebec.

From the mouth of the Chenaux river, the current descends on  southwards the course of the Lombrette River, then on  generally south by the course of the Sainte-Anne River, to the northwest shore of the Saint-Laurent river.

Toponymy 
The toponym "rivière des Chenaux" was formalized on December 5, 1968 at the Place Names Bank of the Commission de toponymie du Québec.

References

See also 

 Capitale-Nationale, an administrative region
 Charlevoix Regional County Municipality
 La Côte-de-Beaupré Regional County Municipality
 Petite-Rivière-Saint-François, a municipality
 Saint-Tite-des-Caps, a municipality
 Lombrette River
 Sainte-Anne River (Beaupré)
 St. Lawrence River
 List of rivers of Quebec

Rivers of Capitale-Nationale
Charlevoix Regional County Municipality
La Côte-de-Beaupré Regional County Municipality